Henryk Lipp is a well-known Polish-born Swedish musician, songwriter and music producer from Gothenburg, Sweden.

Beginnings
He started his musical career in the late 1970s and early 1980s with the Swedish band Extra alongside Anne-Lie Rydé, amongst others.

In Blue for Two
  
In 1984, he teamed up with Freddie Wadling to form the alternative rock duo Blue for Two with Wadling on vocals and Lipp as songwriter and on synthesizer. They went on to release a number of albums including with Wadling (on vocals) and Henryk Lipp as songwriter and synthesizers. They had a string of albums including Blue for Two (1986), Songs from a Pale and Bitter Moon (1988), Search & Enjoy (1992), Earbound (1994) and Moments (1997). The band became very popular and one of the main bands in the Swedish alternative scene in the 1980s. For their live performances, they were often accompanied by Sator guitarist Chips Kiesbye. The duo also made a comeback in 2012 with the album Tune the Piano, Hand Me a Razor reaching #18 in the Swedish Albums Chart.

Producing
After the break-up of Blue for Two, Lipp concentrated on a music writing and producing career. He works through "Music A Matic Studio", established in 1982 as a partnership between producer Lipp and fellow producer Chips Kiesbye.

Amongst the artists Lipp has produced at various times include:
Burst
Dead Man
Millencolin
Håkan Hellström
Sator
Stonefunkers
Thåström
Union Carbide Productions

He was also a guest musician for Swedish band Destiny

References

External links
Music A Matic Studio official website
Henryk LIpp page on Music A Matic Studio website 
Henryk Lipp on Myspace

Swedish record producers
Polish emigrants to Sweden
Living people
Year of birth missing (living people)